Ahr is a tributary of the Rhine River in Germany.

AHR, AhR, Ahr, or AHr may also refer to:

Places
 Ahr (South Tyrol), the Ahr tributary in South Tyrol, Italy
 Ahr Hills, range of low mountains in Germany
 Ahr (wine region), Germany

People
 George W. Ahr (1904–1993), American prelate of the Roman Catholic Church
 Gustav Elijah Åhr (1996–2017), American singer and songwriter, known professionally as Lil Peep

Science and medicine
 aHR, adjusted hazard ratio
 AHr, ampere hour
 Airway hyper-responsiveness
 Aqueous homogeneous reactor
 Aryl hydrocarbon receptor (AhR), a protein

Organizations and companies
 Abbey Holford Rowe, architecture firm
 Advancing Human Rights
 Air Adriatic (ICAO airline code AHR), now defunct
 The American Historical Review, a scholarly journal

Other
 Ahirani language (ISO-639-3 code ahr)
 Assisted Human Reproduction Act

See also

 AAR (disambiguation)
 AH (disambiguation)
 Ahir, an Indian caste
 AHRC (disambiguation)
 AHRS, attitude and heading reference system
 AR (disambiguation)
 ARR (disambiguation)